Tamara Shanidze (born 5 July 1969) is a Georgian sprinter. She competed in the women's 100 metres at the 2000 Summer Olympics.

References

1969 births
Living people
Athletes (track and field) at the 2000 Summer Olympics
Female sprinters from Georgia (country)
Olympic athletes of Georgia (country)
Place of birth missing (living people)
Olympic female sprinters